Megischus is a genus of crown wasp. It was  circumscribed by Gaspard Auguste Brullé in 1846. The genus has a cosmopolitan distribution, and over eighty species are recognized.

It is the type genus of the tribe Megischini, which was circumscribed by Michael S. Engel and David A. Grimaldi in 2004. This tribe is in the subfamily Stephaninae in the family Stephanidae; the other genera in this tribe are Hemistephanus and Pseudomegischus.

Species include:

Megischus alveolifer 
Megischus anaxeus 
Megischus annulator

References

Stephanoidea
Hymenoptera genera